Teri is a given name directly from Teresa. Notable people with the name include:

 Teri Ann Linn (born 1961), American actress and singer
Teri Anulewicz, American politician
 Teri Austin (born 1957), Canadian actress
 Teri Byrne (born 1972), American fitness competitor
 Teri Clemens, retired American volleyball coach
 Teri Copley (born 1961), American actress
 Teri DeSario (born 1951), American singer and songwriter
 Teri Greeves (born 1970), Kiowa-Comanche-Italian beadwork artist
 Teri Garr (born 1944), American actress
 Teri Greeves (born 1970), American artist
 Teri Harrison (born 1981), American model
 Teri Hatcher (born 1964), American actress
 Teri Holbrook, American mystery writer
 Teri Hope, (born 1939), American model and actress
 Teri Lake (born 1972), Canadian curler
 Teri McKeever (born 1962), American college and Olympic swimming coach
 Teri McMinn (born 1951), American actress
 Teri Moïse (born 1970), American singer
 Teri Peterson, (born 1959), American former Playboy playmate
 Teri Polo (born 1969), American actress
 Teri Shields (born 1933), American actress, film producer, socialite, and former model
 Teri Steer-Cantwell (born 1975), American shot putter
 Teri Sue Wood (born 1965), American comic artist
 Teri Takai, Assistant Secretary of Defense for Networks and Information Integration and the Chief Information Officer for the United States Department of Defense (2010-)
 Teri Thornton (1934–2000), American jazz singer
 Teri Tordai, Hungarian actress
 Teri Weigel (born 1962), American former Playboy playmate

Fictional characters
 Teri Bauer, fictional character in the television series 24
 Teri Joseph, fictional character in the television series Soul Food
 Teri Miller, fictional character in the television series CSI: Crime Scene Investigation
 Terri Webber Arnett from General Hospital

See also
 
 Terri
 Terry (disambiguation)

Feminine given names